Danilo Butorović (born 1 July 1984) is a Croatian football coach currently the assistant manager of Slaven Bilić
EFL Championship  club Watford

Coaching career
Butorović played football until the age of 17, when he suffered a bike accident which kept him out of action for several months. During this period he decided to focus on a coaching career rather than a playing one. He began studying to become a coach and earnt his UEFA Pro licence and coaching badges from the Croatian FA.

Butorović began his coaching career as manager of Croatian club HNK Orijent 1919. Taking charge in 2016, during a time when the club was going through liquidation and were reformed. At the beginning of his first season Orijent were bottom of the fourth tier of Croatian football however by the time he departed the club two seasons later, they were competing for promotion to the second tier (something they have now achieved).

Butorović left Orijent for the position of assistant manager at Al-Ittihad. He had been brought over by Slaven Bilić, who he had a relationship with dating back to when he went to Bilić's West Ham training camp whilst he was serving as manager of the club. Butorović left Al-Ittihad along with Bilić and his assistants after a disappointing start to the season.

In June 2019, Butorović was appointed Assistant Head Coach of English club West Bromwich Albion again working as assistant to manager Slaven Bilić, along with fellow assistant Dean Računica who both served as assistants to Bilić at Al-Ittihad.

References

1984 births
Living people
Sportspeople from Rijeka
Croatian football managers
HNK Orijent managers
Association football coaches
Beijing Guoan F.C. non-playing staff
West Bromwich Albion F.C. non-playing staff
Watford F.C. non-playing staff
Croatian expatriate sportspeople in England
Croatian expatriate sportspeople in Saudi Arabia